Flavio Méndez Santiago (alias El Amarillo) is a Mexican drug lord of Los Zetas.

Kingpin Act sanction
On 24 March 2010, the United States Department of the Treasury sanctioned Méndez Santiago under the Foreign Narcotics Kingpin Designation Act (sometimes referred to simply as the "Kingpin Act"), for his involvement in drug trafficking along with fifty-three other international criminals and ten foreign entities. The act prohibited U.S. citizens and companies from doing any kind of business activity with him, and virtually froze all his assets in the U.S.

Arrest
He was captured on January 18, 2011 in Villa de Etla, Oaxaca.

See also
List of Mexico's 37 most-wanted drug lords

References

1975 births
Living people
Mexican crime bosses
People sanctioned under the Foreign Narcotics Kingpin Designation Act